The BMW N42 is a DOHC four-cylinder petrol engine which replaced the BMW M43 and was produced from 2001-2004.

The N42 serves as the basis for the smaller N40 engine (which does not have Valvetronic).

The N42B18 won the 1.4-1.8 L category of the International Engine of the Year awards for 2001.

In 2004, the N42 was replaced by the BMW N46 four-cylinder engine.

Design 
Compared with its M43 predecessor, the N42 features a DOHC valvetrain, VANOS (variable valve timing) and an aluminium engine block. It was the first BMW engine to have Valvetronic (variable valve lift).

Versions

N42B18

Applications:
 2001-2004 E46 316i and 316ti

N42B20
The N42B20 revs to 6600 rpm

Applications:
 2001-2004 E46 318i/318Ci/318ti

See also
 BMW
 List of BMW engines

References

N42
Straight-four engines
Gasoline engines by model